KLTT (670 AM) is a radio station broadcasting a Christian Talk format to the Denver, Colorado, and Colorado Springs, United States, areas. The station is currently owned by Crawford Broadcasting and is licensed to Colorado subsidiary KLZ Radio, Inc. With its 50,000-watt daytime signal, KLTT broadcasts can be received throughout most of the state. This powerful daytime signal reaches into southeastern Wyoming, northeastern New Mexico, and into the western portions of Nebraska and Kansas. At night, the station reduces power to 1,400 watts, with a directional signal to the north and south to protect Class-A clear-channel station WSCR in Chicago.

History
The station began broadcasting in early 1996, holding the call sign KLDC and airing a religious format. On April 5, 1996, its call sign was changed to KLTT.

References

External links
Official website

Radio stations established in 1996
Commerce City, Colorado
1996 establishments in Colorado
LTT